"Edge of Reality" is a song first recorded by Elvis Presley as part of the soundtrack for his 1968 motion picture Live a Little, Love a Little, released to cinemas on October 23.

In October or November 1968 it was released on a single (RCA Victor 47–9670) with "If I Can Dream" (from his soon to be released album Elvis, the soundtrack for the upcoming NBC TV comeback special) on the other side. The single was the first Presley record on the orange label.

On December 1, 1970, the single "If I Can Dream" / "Edge of Reality" was re-released as part of RCA Victor's Gold Standard Series (together with 9 other Presley's singles).

Writing and recording 
The song was written by Bernie Baum, Bill Giant, and Florence Kaye.

Elvis Presley recorded it in March 1968.

Charts

References

External links 
 Elvis Presley - If I Can Dream / Edge of Reality  at Discogs
 Elvis Presley — Edge of Reality at Australian-charts.com
 Further reading
 Cameron Crowe’s Top 10 (Or So) Music Moments in Film – The Uncool - The Official Site for Everything Cameron Crowe
 Elvis Presley's 7 Most Bizarre Movie Moments at Gizmodo Australia

 The guilty pleasures of great directors · Great Job, Internet! at the A.V. Club

1968 songs
Elvis Presley songs
Protest songs
RCA Records singles
Songs written by Bernie Baum
Songs written by Bill Giant
Songs written by Florence Kaye
Songs written for films